In the Ecstasy of Billions is a 1920 German film directed by Richard Eichberg and featuring Béla Lugosi and Violetta Napierska. It was a sequel to The Curse of Man.

Cast
 Lee Parry
 Violetta Napierska
 Felix Hecht
 Robert Scholz
 Willy Kaiser-Heyl
 Reinhold Pasch
 Béla Lugosi
 Paul Ludwig
 Dary Holm

See also
 Béla Lugosi filmography

References

External links

1920 films
Films of the Weimar Republic
German black-and-white films
German silent feature films
Films directed by Richard Eichberg
German sequel films